John Michael Clancy (May 7, 1837 – July 25, 1903) was an American businessman and politician who served three terms as  a United States representative from New York from 1889 to 1895.

Biography 
Born in County Laois, Ireland, he immigrated with his parents to the United States and settled in New York City. He attended the public schools of Brooklyn, engaged in the real-estate business, served as an alderman of the city of Brooklyn from 1868 to 1875, and was a member of the New York State Assembly in 1878, 1879 (both Kings Co., 1st D.), 1880 and 1881 (both Kings Co., 4th D.).

Tenure in Congress 
Clancy was elected as a Democrat to the Fifty-first, Fifty-second, and Fifty-third Congresses (March 4, 1889 – March 3, 1895); he was not a candidate for renomination in 1894.

Later career and death 
He then resumed the real-estate business in New York City. He was an unsuccessful candidate for election in 1896 to the Fifty-fifth Congress and died in Butte, Montana while returning from a visit to Yellowstone Park. Interment was in Holy Cross Cemetery, New York City.

References

External links

 

 
 

1837 births
1903 deaths
Burials at Holy Cross Cemetery, Brooklyn
Irish emigrants to the United States (before 1923)
Democratic Party members of the New York State Assembly
People from Brooklyn
People from County Laois
Politicians from County Laois
Democratic Party members of the United States House of Representatives from New York (state)
19th-century American politicians